Clarence Howeth "Ginger" Beaumont (July 23, 1876 – April 10, 1956) was an American center fielder in Major League Baseball who spent most of his career with the Pittsburgh Pirates (1899–1906) and Boston Braves (1907–1909). He was born in Rochester, Wisconsin, and attended Beloit College. During the years 1900–1904 – with the Pirates winning pennants from 1901–1903 – Beaumont led the National League in hits three times, scored 100 runs four times, leading the league once, and also captured the 1902 batting championship with a .357 mark. As the Pirates' regular leadoff hitter, he was the first player ever to bat in a World Series game.

Nicknamed "Ginger" for his thick red hair, he used his excellent speed to great advantage; on the day before his 23rd birthday in his rookie season, he had six infield singles and became the first player to score six runs in a game. He was also the first player in major league history to lead his league in hits three consecutive years, which has been accomplished by only five others; he led the NL in hits a fourth time with the 1907 Braves. Often bothered by leg injuries, he joined the Chicago Cubs for the 1910 season, and made pinch-hitting appearances in the first three games of the 1910 World Series before leaving the major leagues with a .311 career batting average and on-base average of .362. He played one more season in the minor leagues before retiring to his Honey Creek, Wisconsin farm. He was one of the first inductees to the Wisconsin Athletic Hall of Fame in 1951. Beaumont suffered two strokes in his seventies, and died at age 79 in Burlington, Wisconsin.

Beaumont has a baseball field named after him in his hometown of Burlington. His name also represents part of the Burlington Little League organization.  In July 2015, a monument to Beaumont was dedicated at Beaumont Field.

See also
List of Major League Baseball career stolen bases leaders
List of Major League Baseball batting champions
List of Major League Baseball annual runs scored leaders
Major League Baseball titles leaders
List of Major League Baseball single-game hits leaders

References

Baseball: The Biographical Encyclopedia (2000). Kingston, New York: Total/Sports Illustrated. .

External links

1876 births
1956 deaths
19th-century baseball players
Major League Baseball center fielders
Pittsburgh Pirates players
Boston Braves players
Chicago Cubs players
Baseball players from Wisconsin
People from Rochester, Wisconsin
National League batting champions
Milwaukee Brewers (minor league) players
Milwaukee Creams players
St. Paul Saints (AA) players
Beloit College alumni